Happening is a 2000 autobiographical novel by Annie Ernaux.

Synopsis
Set in 1963, four years before the legalization of oral contraception in France and twelve years before the Veil Act, the autobiographical narrative describes the troubles a young student faces when seeking out an illegal abortion. The story begins by depicting how she waited at Lariboisière Hospital for the result of a serology examination for HIV and how she "burst out laughing" as the result was "negative". Following this she speaks about a similar gruelling experience of finding out her pregnancy and the consequences such as hiding it from her parents and public, searching for a doctor who would illegally abort the child, revealing pregnancy to some close ones for help in abortion and the horror of abortion itself, which is the rest of the book. Entries from her journal frame the events from the first three months of her pregnancy to the abortion and recovery.

Reception
Claire Devarrieux of Libération wrote that Ernaux's story "transcends individuality". Emily Eakin of The New York Times Book Review wrote, "As subject matter goes, little could be more inherently provocative. Ernaux's take is all the more so for being unabashedly philosophical rather than moral." Joy Press of The Village Voice wrote, "Ernaux connects her experience to the wider world of class and religion and law, resulting in a startling, unusual portrait of how a vagina really lives in the world."

Film adaptation

In 2021, the novel was adapted into a film of the same name, directed by Audrey Diwan. The film had its world premiere at the 78th Venice International Film Festival where it received the top prize, the Golden Lion.

References

2000 French novels
French autobiographical novels
French novels adapted into films
Novels by Annie Ernaux
Novels about abortion
Novels set in the 1960s
Fiction set in 1963